You Know Who You Are may refer to:
 You Know Who You Are (Nick Gilder album), 1977
 You Know Who You Are (Nada Surf album), 2015